Valdese may refer to:

 Valdese, North Carolina
 Waldensians, Valdese in Italian

See also
 Valdez (disambiguation)